"Story of Your Life" is a science fiction novella by American writer Ted Chiang, first published in Starlight 2 in 1998, and in 2002 in Chiang's collection of short stories, Stories of Your Life and Others. Its major themes are language and determinism.

"Story of Your Life" won the 2000 Nebula Award for Best Novella, as well as the 1999 Theodore Sturgeon Award. It was nominated for the 1999 Hugo Award for Best Novella. The novella has been translated into Italian, Japanese, French and German.

A film adaptation of the story, Arrival, was conceived and adapted by Eric Heisserer. Titled and directed by Denis Villeneuve, it was released in 2016. It stars Amy Adams, Jeremy Renner, and Forest Whitaker and was nominated for eight Academy Awards, including Best Picture and Best Adapted Screenplay; it won the award for Best Sound Editing. The film also won the 2017 Ray Bradbury Award for Outstanding Dramatic Presentation and the Hugo Award for Best Dramatic Presentation.

Plot
"Story of Your Life" is narrated by linguist Dr. Louise Banks the day her daughter is conceived. Addressed to her daughter, the story alternates between recounting the past: the coming of the aliens and the deciphering of their language; and remembering the future: what will happen to her daughter as she grows up, and the daughter's untimely death.

The aliens arrive in spaceships and enter Earth's orbit; 112  devices resembling large semi-circular mirrors appear at sites across the globe. Dubbed "looking glasses", they are audiovisual links to the aliens in orbit, who are called heptapods for their seven-limbed radially symmetrical appearance. Louise and physicist Dr. Gary Donnelly are recruited by the U.S. Army to communicate with the aliens, and are assigned to one of nine looking glass sites in the US. They make contact with two heptapods they nickname Flapper and Raspberry. In an attempt to learn their language, Louise begins by associating objects and gestures with sounds the aliens make, which reveals a language with free word order and many levels of center-embedded clauses. She finds their writing to be chains of semagrams on a two-dimensional surface in no linear sequence, and semasiographic, having no reference to speech. Louise concludes that, because their speech and writing are unrelated, the heptapods have two languages, which she calls Heptapod A (speech) and Heptapod B (writing).

Attempts are also made to establish heptapod terminology in physics. Little progress is made, until a presentation of Fermat's Principle of Least Time is given. Gary explains the principle to Louise, giving the example of the refraction of light, and that light will always take the fastest possible route. Louise reasons, "[a] ray of light has to know where it will ultimately end up before it can choose the direction to begin moving in." She knows the heptapods do not write a sentence one semagram at a time, but draw all the ideograms simultaneously, suggesting they know what the entire sentence will be beforehand. Louise realizes that instead of experiencing events sequentially (causality), heptapods experience all events at once (teleology). This is reflected in their language, and explains why Fermat's principle came naturally to them.

Soon, Louise becomes quite proficient at Heptapod B, and finds that when writing in it, trains of thought are directionless, and premises and conclusions interchangeable. She finds herself starting to think in Heptapod B and begins to see time as heptapods do. Louise sees glimpses of her future and of a daughter she does not yet have. This raises questions about the nature of free will: knowledge of the future would imply no free will, because knowing the future means it cannot be changed. But Louise asks herself, "What if the experience of knowing the future changed a person? What if it evoked a sense of urgency, a sense of obligation to act precisely as she knew she would?"

One day, after an information exchange with the heptapods, the aliens announce they are leaving. They shut down the looking glasses and their ships disappear. It is never established why they leave, or why they had come in the first place.

Background
In the "Story Notes" section of Stories of Your Life and Others, Chiang writes that inspiration for "Story of Your Life" came from his fascination in the variational principle in physics. When he saw American actor Paul Linke's performance in his play Time Flies When You’re Alive, about his wife's struggle with breast cancer, Chiang realized he could use this principle to show how someone deals with the inevitable. Regarding the theme of the story, Chiang said that Kurt Vonnegut summed it up in his introduction in the 25th anniversary edition of his novel Slaughterhouse-Five:

In a 2010 interview Chiang said that "Story of Your Life" addresses the subject of free will. The philosophical debates about whether or not we have free will are all abstract, but knowing the future makes the question very real. Chiang added, "If you know what's going to happen, can you keep it from happening? Even when a story says that you can't, the emotional impact arises from the feeling that you should be able to."

Chiang spent five years researching and familiarizing himself in the field of linguistics before attempting to write "Story of Your Life."

Reception 
In The New York Review of Books American author James Gleick said that "Story of Your Life" poses the questions: would knowing your future be a gift or a curse, and is free will simply an illusion? Gleick wrote "For us ordinary mortals, the day-to-day experience of a preordained future is almost unimaginable", but Chiang does just that in this story, he "imagine[s] it". In a review of Chiang's Stories of Your Life and Others in The Guardian, English fantasy author China Miéville described "Story of Your Life" as "tender" with an "astonishingly moving culmination", which he said is "surprising" considering it is achieved using science.

Writing in Kirkus Reviews Ana Grilo called it a "thought-provoking, beautiful story". He said that in contrast to the familiar fare of lavish stories involving aliens, "Story of Your Life" is "a breath of fresh air" whose objective "is to not only to learn how to communicate but how to communicate effectively." In a review in Entertainment Monthly Samantha Schraub said that the story's two narratives, Louise recalling the unraveling of the heptapods' language, and telling her yet-to-be-born daughter what will happen to her, creates "an ambiguity and air of mystery, which make the reader question everything that unfolds". Schraub called it "an award-worthy science fiction novella that will resonate with readers, and leave them thinking how they would live—or even change—their present, if they knew their future."

Awards

Publication history

Source: Internet Speculative Fiction Database

References

Works cited

External links 

 

1998 short stories
Nebula Award for Best Novella-winning works
Works by Ted Chiang
Language in fiction
Short stories adapted into films
Theodore Sturgeon Award-winning works
Interpreting and translation in fiction
Alien visitations in fiction
Nonlinear narrative literature